Rajashree is an Indian novelist and film-maker. She has been working in the Mumbai film industry after studying film direction at the Film and Television Institute of India. She has written and directed a film, The Rebel, which won a National Award in the  Best Short Fiction Film category at the 43rd National Film Awards. The jury presented the award "for showing an adolescent's journey to maturity and his coming to terms with his mother." The film was screened at many film festivals. She has made a film about communal violence called The Connection.

Her critically acclaimed debut, Trust Me,  is the biggest-selling Indian chick lit novel. It is set in Bollywood, the Mumbai film industry, and uses the narrative structure of a 'masala' Bollywood film.

She currently lives and works in Mumbai, India.

See also
 List of Indian writers

References

Year of birth missing (living people)
Living people
Indian women novelists
Chick lit writers
Indian women film directors
Film and Television Institute of India alumni
Screenwriters from Mumbai
Indian women screenwriters
21st-century Indian film directors